Sander Arends and Antonio Šančić were the defending champions but only Šančić chose to defend his title, partnering Purav Raja. Šančić lost in the finals to Sander Gillé and Joran Vliegen.

Gillé and Vliegen won the title after defeating Raja and Šančić 3–6, 6–3, [10–3] in the final.

Seeds

Draw

References
 Main Draw

Sparkassen ATP Challenger - Doubles
2018 Doubles